Kazuhiko Aomoto is a Japanese mathematician who introduced the Aomoto-Gel'fand hypergeometric function and the Aomoto integral.

He was a professor at Nagoya University. In 1996 he received the Mathematical Society of Japan autumn prize for his research on complex integration.

References

21st-century Japanese mathematicians
Living people
Year of birth missing (living people)
Academic staff of Nagoya University
Complex analysts